Kevin Moran (born 12 May 1963) is a former Irish Independent politician who has served as a Minister of State from 2017 to 2020. He served as a Teachta Dála (TD) for the Longford–Westmeath constituency from 2016 to 2020.

He was a member of Westmeath County Council from 1999 to 2016, and represented Fianna Fáil until 2011. In January 2006, he contested Fianna Fáil's nomination to stand at the 2007 general election, being narrowly defeated by Mary O'Rourke. He contested the 2014 by-election as an Independent candidate, but failed to win a seat. He joined the Independent Alliance ahead of the 2016 general election. Moran was elected to Dáil Éireann in February 2016. After lengthy government formation talks, the Independent Alliance supported the nomination of Enda Kenny as Taoiseach on 6 May 2016, allowing Kenny to become the first leader of Fine Gael to be re-elected to this office.

On 3 June 2017, he was appointed by the government as Minister of State at the Department of Public Expenditure and Reform with responsibility for the Office of Public Works and Flood Relief. This was part of arrangement with fellow Independent Alliance TD Seán Canney, who had been serving in that position. Moran's appointment lapsed on the resignation of Enda Kenny as Taoiseach later that month on 14 June. On 20 June 2017, Moran was appointed by the government formed by Leo Varadkar to the same position.

He lost his seat at the 2020 general election, continuing to serve as a minister of state until the formation of a new government on 27 June 2020.

In January 2022, he was expected to become a member of Westmeath County Council after his son Jamie resigned his position on the council due to work commitments. However his admission was not accepted by the majority of the incumbent council.

Personal life
Moran left school at 13 with severe dyslexia, and started work in the building trade, later moving on to develop a taxi business. He has spoken about other problems in his life, including the death of a brother, which have caused him to attempt suicide.

He is married and lives in Athlone. Moran is often referred to by the nickname "Boxer", a nickname which arose from him hitting an opponent in a football game at the age of 12.

References

1968 births
Living people
Fianna Fáil politicians
Independent TDs
Local councillors in County Westmeath
Members of the 32nd Dáil
Ministers of State of the 32nd Dáil
People from Athlone
Politicians with dyslexia